The R128 road is a regional road in Fingal, Ireland.

The official description of the R128 from the Roads Act 1993 (Classification of Regional Roads) Order 2012  reads:

R128: Lusk - Rush - Skerries, County Dublin

Between its junction with R127 Rathmore Road at Lusk and its junction with R127 at Balbriggan Street in the town of Skerries via Station Road at Lusk; Whitestown; Main Street and Skerries Road at Rush; Loughshinney Cross; Strand Street and Thomas Hand Street in the town of Skerries all in the county of Fingal.

See also
Roads in Ireland
National primary road
National secondary road
Regional road

References

Regional roads in the Republic of Ireland
Roads in Fingal